Lee Ji-Nam  (born 21 November 1984) is a South Korean football player who plays for Jeonnam Dragons.

Club career

FC Seoul
He appeared in 4 matches only at League Cup in 2004. He played for Police FC while on military service.

Daegu FC
On 4 January 2011, Lee signed for Daegu FC. Lee made his debut for Daegu FC on 5 March 2011, playing the full 90 minutes in Daegu's opening game of the 2011 K-League season loss 2–3 against Gwangju FC. He scored his Daegu FC first goal against Incheon United on 20 March 2011. In his next game, Lee scored his second Daegu goal in a 1–0 win against Chunnam Dragons.

Henan Jianye
On 6 February 2014, Lee transferred to Henan Jianye.

Jeonman Dragons
On 4 January 2015, Lee transferred to Jeonnam Dragons.

References

External links 
 

1984 births
Living people
South Korean footballers
FC Seoul players
Gyeongnam FC players
Daegu FC players
Jeonnam Dragons players
K League 1 players
K League 2 players
Chinese Super League players
Henan Songshan Longmen F.C. players
South Korean expatriate sportspeople in China
Expatriate footballers in China
Association football defenders
Association football midfielders
People from Jeonju
Sportspeople from North Jeolla Province